Auzebosc is a commune in the Seine-Maritime department in the Normandy region in northern France.

Geography

Heraldry

Population

Places of interest
 The ruins of a 15th-century castle.
 An eighteenth-century château.
 A seventeenth-century stone cross.
 The church of St.Jean-Baptiste, dating from the sixteenth century.

See also
Communes of the Seine-Maritime department

References

Communes of Seine-Maritime